Project Orion may refer to:

 Project Orion (nuclear propulsion), a study for a nuclear-powered spacecraft
 Orion (laser), built in the UK to research thermonuclear explosions
 Orion (spacecraft), a spacecraft part of the Artemis program
 The code name for the sequel of Cyberpunk 2077

 See also Orion (disambiguation)